Icalma Lake is a lake of glacial origin located in the Andes of the La Araucanía Region of Chile. A hamlet on the southern shore of the lake is also called Icalma. About  from the hamlet is Icalma Pass,  in elevation and on the border with Argentina. The pass is traversed by a road, unpaved in Chile in 2017 and sometimes impassable during the Southern Hemisphere winter due to heavy snows.

Icalma Lake and nearby Galletué Lake are the sources of the Bio Bio River.

Flora and Fauna
The most abundant species of fish in the lake is the brown trout.  The lake also has a population of rainbow trout.  Neither species is native to Chile.

The lake and village are in the ecoregion of the Valdivian Temperate Rain Forest.  The monkey-puzzle tree (Araucaria araucana) locally called "pehuen" is the most distinctive of the tree species in the forest.

Climate
Under the Köppen climate classification, Icalma has an oceanic climate, designated Csb.  Under the Trewartha climate classification the climate is Crlk: mild summers, cool winters, and humid.

See also
Llaima
Sollipulli

References

Lakes of Chile
Lakes of Araucanía Region